David James Hickman (May 19, 1892 – December 30, 1958) was a former professional baseball player who played outfield from 1915 to 1919.

External links

1892 births
1958 deaths
Major League Baseball outfielders
Brooklyn Robins players
Baltimore Terrapins players
Baseball players from Tennessee
People from Johnson City, Tennessee
Winston-Salem Twins players
Asheville Tourists players
Chattanooga Lookouts players
Burials at Holy Cross Cemetery, Brooklyn